La maison des bois (engl. The house in the woods) is a 1971 French mini-series, consisting of seven episodes. It was directed by Maurice Pialat and written by René Wheeler, starring Pierre Doris, Jacqueline Dufranne and Agathe Natanson.

The mini-series takes place during World War I and tells about the daily life in a French village.

Gaumont has released the mini-series on DVD in 2005.

References

External links
 

Films directed by Maurice Pialat
1970s French television miniseries
World War I television drama series
1970s French television series
1971 French television series debuts
1971 French television series endings